Det Tapte Liv is an EP by the Norwegian unblack metal band Antestor, released in 2004 by Endtime Productions.

Recording
The EP contains songs recorded at Antestor's studio sessions in 2004 at Top Room Studios. The band felt that these songs did not fit into the 2005's The Forsaken full-length and were released on this EP. The EP served as a taster for the upcoming album.

Det Tapte Liv includes two actual songs, "Rites of Death" and "Med Hevede Sverd", and three atmospheric piano and keyboard-based instrumental songs. The song structures are progressive and include several tempo changes. Pekka Ryhänen, reviewer of the Finnish metal site Imperiumi.net, gave the EP 9/10 and describes the style as "modern, artistic, and fast dark metal".

At first, Det Tapte Liv was released in a special limited 1,000 copies  heavy printer box edition. The box had room for the upcoming full-length. Later, the EP was released as a regular jewel case with different cover art done by Kristian Wåhlin.

The album cover of Det Tapte Liv shows a painting of the Borgund stave church.  The cover of the EP and the album art for The Forsaken together form a single landscape image.

Line-up 
 Vrede (a.k.a. Ronny Hansen) – vocals
 Sygmoon (a.k.a. Morten Sigmund Mageroy) – keyboards
 Vemod (a.k.a. Lars Stokstad) – guitar
 Gard (a.k.a. Vegard Undal) – bass
 Hellhammer (a.k.a. Jan Axel Blomberg) – session drums

Track listing

"Rites of Death" (3:46)
"Grief" (3:32)
"Last Season" (3:45)
"Med Hevede Sverd" (4:50)
"Det Tapte Liv" (2:46)

References

External links
Review at Imperiumi (Finnish)
Review at The Whipping Post
Review at Guitar6
The EP at Firestream
Review at No Life 'til Metal

Antestor albums
Albums with cover art by Kristian Wåhlin
2004 EPs